Simeneh-ye Olya (also Romanized as Sīmeneh-ye ‘Olyā; also known as Sīmīnāh, Sīmīneh, Sīmīneh-ye Bālā, and Sīmīneh-ye ‘Olyā) is a village in Mahidasht Rural District, Mahidasht District, Kermanshah County, Kermanshah Province, Iran. At the 2006 census, its population was 299, in 65 families.

References 

Populated places in Kermanshah County